Agni Pratistha Arkadewi Kuswardono (born 8 December 1987) is an Indonesian actress, graphic designer and beauty pageant titleholder who was the winner of Puteri Indonesia 2006 (Miss Universe Indonesia), she represented Indonesia in the Miss Universe 2007 pageant held in Mexico City, Mexico in May 2007, where she won her Best National Costume award.

Personal life
Agni was born in Canberra, Australia to a traditional Javanese parents, her only sibling sister is actress, Sigi Wimala. Later on 2004, she was settled at Jakarta, Indonesia. Her full name "Agni Pratistha" means invocation of the God of fire was inspired by the Hindu rituals, the name "Agni" means God of Fire in Sanskrit whereas "Pratistha" means invocation. She holds a bachelor degree in Graphic Design from the Bina Nusantara University in Jakarta, Indonesia, after graduated she worked at CosmoGirl Indonesia as an Executive Editor from 2007 to 2012.

On 17 June 2013, Agni was married with an Extreme E-Kart racing, Ryan Anthony Monoarfa in Las Vegas, United States, due to religious difference, the wedding was held outside Indonesia. But the wedding reception was held on 14 December 2013 in Jakarta, Indonesia. she is giving birth to her first son Rudra Arka Monoarfa on 18 June 2014, her second son Bhaga Soma Monoarfa was born on June 22, 2017, and her third son Varuna Bayu Monoarfa was born on October 23, 2019, Currently, Agni is an entrepreneur, She founded Chubby Max cookies and Ark Motion Images together with her husband, Ryan Anthony Monoarfa.

Pageantry

Puteri Indonesia 2006
Representing her province Central Java, Agni was crowned Puteri Indonesia 2006 at the finals held at the Taman Mini Indonesia Indah, Jakarta, on 25 August 2006 by the outgoing titleholder of Puteri Indonesia 2005, Nadine Chandrawinata of Jakarta SCR. She was crowned together with Rahma Landy Sjahruddin from Jakarta SCR who won the title of Puteri Indonesia Lingkungan at the end of the event.

Miss Universe 2007

As Indonesia's representative in the Miss Universe 2007 pageant, Agni travelled to Mexico City, Mexico in end of April to participate in the four weeks of quarantine events, rehearsals and preliminary competitions with the other seventy-seven delegates.

Agni was the close friend of the  Miss Universe 2007 winner, Riyo Mori of Japan. At the final coronation night, Agni's Dayak inspired costume ended won Best National Costume award for the first time for Indonesia.

Filmography
As an actress, Agni appeared on several films. Agni started her foray into acting in 2004, starred on Mengejar Matahari (Chasing the Sun), which was shown in the 2005 International Film Festival Rotterdam. In 2018, Agni starred in leading role in all three omnibus episodes of Asian Three-Fold Mirror 2018: The Journey (The Sea, Hekishu, and Variable No.3), directed by Japan's Daichi Matsunaga, Indonesia's Edwin and China's Degena Yun. The film was co-produced by Tokyo International Film Festival and Japan Foundation Asian Center, a part of biannual Asian Three-Fold Mirror Project. It had its world premiere at the 31st Tokyo International Film Festival on October 26, 2018.

Movies

Awards and nomination
Agni Pratistha received trophy for her contribution to Indonesian modelling and acting at the 2012 Asia Model Festival Awards in Seoul, South Korea.

See also
 Puteri Indonesia
 Miss Universe
 Miss Universe 2007
 Rahma Landy Sjahruddin

References

External links 
 Official site
 
 
 Official Puteri Indonesia Official Website
 Official Miss Universe Official Website
 Puteri Indonesia
 https://web.archive.org/web/20071007183711/http://missuniverse.exposuremanager.com/g/universe_eveninggown_portraits

Living people
1987 births
Actresses from Canberra
Indonesian Christians
Indonesian female models
Indonesian film actresses
Javanese people
Indonesian people of Australian descent
Miss Universe 2007 contestants
Puteri Indonesia winners